Phanias may refer to:
 A historic person:
 Phanias of Eresus in Lesbos, Greek philosopher
 Phanias (Stoic philosopher), a Stoic philosopher, disciple of Posidonius. Diogenes Laërtius mentions a work of his wherein he compares Posidonius with Panaetius in arguing from physical principles (see )
 Phanias (Athenian Commander), an Athenian naval commander during the Corinthian War
 Phanias (spider), a genus of jumping spiders